Sch 642305 is a chemical compound isolated from Penicillium verrucosum that inhibits bacterial DNA primase.

References

Lactones
Heterocyclic compounds with 2 rings